Catocoryne is a genus of flowering plants belonging to the family Melastomataceae.

Its native range is Peru and Colombia.

Species:
 Catocoryne linneoides Hook.f.

References

Melastomataceae
Melastomataceae genera